Rich Fountain is an unincorporated community in Osage County, Missouri, United States. It is located approximately three miles east of U.S. Route 63 and is fifteen miles southeast of Jefferson City.

History
Rich Fountain had its start circa 1839, when John Strumpf built a gristmill there. The community was named for a spring near the original town site. A post office called Rich Fountain was established in 1854, and remained in operation until 1972.

The Sacred Heart Catholic Church and Parsonage was listed on the National Register of Historic Places in 1982.

References

Unincorporated communities in Osage County, Missouri
Jefferson City metropolitan area
Unincorporated communities in Missouri